The twelfth series of The Bill, a British television drama, consisted of 156 episodes, broadcast between 2 January and 31 December 1996. On 6 February 2013, The Bill Series 12 Part 1 & 2 and The Bill Series 12 Part 3 & 4 DVD sets were released (in Australia). The show aired the death of PC Cathy Marshall early in the series, actress Lynne Miller departing after seven years in a mysterious plot that saw her drown whilst chasing a suspect, but it was never confirmed if she was pushed or slipped off a riverside barge during the pursuit. The death followed that of DS Jo Morgan in a four-part special towards the end of the previous series, with the first three of the four episodes rebroadcast in the summer as part of a single special episode; Target.

There was also an exit for PC Donna Harris, as the role of collator was replaced by a computerised system. Two other characters departed, with Robert Perkins leaving his role as Sergeant Ray Steele after almost three years, with WPC June Ackland taking the role of Sergeant after six months as an Acting Sergeant. Tom Cotcher also left the role of DC Alan Woods, being replaced by WDC Liz Rawton, with actress Libby Davison joining the show permanently just four months after making a guest appearance as Briony Richards. Rawton's arrival to CID was preceded by that of DS Geoff Daly in June, portrayed by Ray Ashcroft. WPC Jamila Blake arrived at the end of the year to replace WPC Marshall, Lolita Chakrabarti taking on the role after two guest appearances earlier in the series as Dr. Sally Vole.

Cast changes

Arrivals
 DS Geoff Daly (Episode 67-)
 WDC Liz Rawton (Episode 107-)
 WPC Jamila Blake (Episode 156-)

Departures
 WPC Cathy Marshall - Fatally drowned whilst chasing a suspect
 WPC Donna Harris - Unexplained; exit preceded by elimination of collator role
 Sgt. Ray Steele - Unexplained
 DC Alan Woods - Transferred away

Episodes
{| class="wikitable plainrowheaders" style="width:100%; margin:auto; background:#FFFFFF;"
|-style="color:#804"
! style="background-color:#FF66AA;" width="20"|#
! style="background-color:#FF66AA;" width="150"|Title
! style="background-color:#FF66AA;" width="230"|Episode notes
! style="background-color:#FF66AA;" width="140"|Directed by
! style="background-color:#FF66AA;" width="150"|Written by
! style="background-color:#FF66AA;" width="100"|Original air date

|}

1996 British television seasons
The Bill series